Sir John Dashwood-King, 3rd Baronet (4 August 1716 – 6 December 1793), was an English country gentleman. Born John Dashwood, he adopted the additional surname of King by the terms of his uncle Dr. John King's will.

Early life
The son of Sir Francis Dashwood, 1st Baronet, by his third wife, Mary King, he was the half-brother of the infamous Francis Dashwood, 2nd Baronet. He was a member of the Hellfire Club which his brother had founded.

Career

His principal interests lay in his lands in Wales and Lincolnshire which he had inherited from his maternal uncles. From 1753 until 1761, he served as Member of Parliament for the pocket borough of Bishop's Castle, controlled by his brother-in-law John Walcott.

He served as High Sheriff of Montgomeryshire in 1777. On the death of his half-brother in 1781 he inherited the baronetcy and West Wycombe Park, but made no significant changes there before his death in 1793.

Personal life
In 1761, he married Sarah Moore (d. 9 April 1777), by whom he had eight children, of whom four survived him:

 Francis Dashwood-King, (d. 9 November 1779)
 Sir John Dashwood-King, 4th Baronet (1765–1849), who married Mary Anne Broadhead, in 1789.
 William Dashwood-King (d. 1773)
 George Dashwood-King (d. 1801), who married Elizabeth Callander of Craigforth, in 1794.
 Sarah Dashwood-King (d. 1834), who married the Rev. John Walcott, son of Charles Walcott, in 1788.
 Elizabeth Dashwood-King (d. 1826), who married Vice-Admiral William Lechmere.
 Charles Dashwood-King (d. 1770)
 Mary Dashwood-King (d. 1774)

Sir John died on 6 December 1793 and was succeeded in the baronetcy by his eldest surviving son, John.

External links
Dashwood genealogy

References

Dashwood-King, Sir John, 3rd Baronet
Dashwood-King, Sir John, 3rd Baronet
Dashwood-King, John
British MPs 1747–1754
British MPs 1754–1761
English landowners
Tory members of the Parliament of Great Britain
Dashwood-King, Sir John, 3rd Baronet
High Sheriffs of Montgomeryshire